Devon Smith (born 20 May 1993) is a former professional Australian rules footballer.
Devon played for the Essendon Football Club and GWS Giants in the Australian Football League (AFL).

Recruited with the 14th overall pick in the 2011 national draft. He made his debut in the opening round of the 2012 AFL season against  at ANZ Stadium. Prior to being drafted he grew up in the town of Lara, Victoria and attended Geelong Grammar School on a sporting scholarship.

He received a nomination for the 2012 AFL Rising Star after he collected 21 disposals, six tackles, five inside-50s and kicked two goals in a 34-point win against .

Following the end of season 2018, Smith was awarded the Crichton medal, naming him the best and fairest player for Essendon in his debut season.

Smith only played eight games in the 2022 season, due to constant knee injuries. On 12th August, Smith announced his retirement.

Statistics
 Statistics are correct to the end of 2021

|- style="background:#eaeaea;"
! scope="row" style="text-align:center" | 2012
|style="text-align:center;"|
| 34 || 20 || 10 || 19 || 174 || 144 || 318 || 61 || 85 || 0.5 || 0.9 || 8.7 || 7.2 || 15.9 || 3.0 || 4.2
|-
! scope="row" style="text-align:center" | 2013
|style="text-align:center;"|
| 10 || 18 || 16 || 11 || 181 || 114 || 295 || 49 || 81 || 0.9 || 0.6 || 10.1 || 6.3 || 16.4 || 2.7 || 4.5
|- style="background:#eaeaea;"
! scope="row" style="text-align:center" | 2014
|style="text-align:center;"|
| 10 || 21 || 26 || 15 || 286 || 166 || 452 || 89 || 95 || 1.2 || 0.7 || 13.6 || 7.9 || 21.5 || 4.2 || 4.5
|-
! scope="row" style="text-align:center" | 2015
|style="text-align:center;"|
| 10 || 20 || 17 || 20 || 242 || 140 || 382 || 70 || 98 || 0.8 || 1.0 || 12.1 || 7.0 || 19.1 || 3.5 || 4.9
|- style="background:#eaeaea;"
! scope="row" style="text-align:center" | 2016
|style="text-align:center;"|
| 10 || 14 || 16 || 18 || 132 || 130 || 262 || 40 || 66 || 1.1 || 1.3 || 9.4 || 9.3 || 18.7 || 2.9 || 4.7
|-
! scope="row" style="text-align:center" | 2017
|style="text-align:center;"|
| 10 || 16 || 15 || 14 || 158 || 138 || 296 || 51 || 79 || 0.9 || 0.9 || 9.9 || 8.6 || 18.5 || 3.2 || 4.9
|- style="background:#eaeaea;"
! scope="row" style="text-align:center" | 2018
|style="text-align:center;"|
| 5 || 22 || 17 || 16 || 290 || 194 || 484 || 83 || 186 || 0.8 || 0.7 || 13.2 || 8.8 || 22.0 || 3.8 || 8.5
|- 
! scope="row" style="text-align:center" | 2019
|style="text-align:center;"|
| 5 || 7 || 3 || 2 || 79 || 48 || 127 || 19 || 40 || 0.4 || 0.3 || 11.3 || 6.9 || 18.1 || 2.7 || 5.7
|- style="background:#eaeaea;"
! scope="row" style="text-align:center" | 2020
|style="text-align:center;"|
| 5 || 16 || 7 || 7 || 158 || 133 || 291 || 40 || 61 || 0.4 || 0.4 || 9.9 || 8.3 || 18.2 || 2.5 || 3.8
|- 
! scope="row" style="text-align:center" | 2021
|style="text-align:center;"|
| 5 || 20 || 16 || 19 || 155 || 128 || 283 || 68 || 78 || 0.8 || 1.0 || 7.8 || 6.4 || 14.2 || 3.4 || 3.9
|- style="background:#EAEAEA; font-weight:bold; width:2em"
| scope="row" text-align:center class="sortbottom" colspan=3 | Career
! 174
! 143
! 141
! 1855
! 1335
! 3190
! 570
! 869
! 0.8
! 0.8
! 10.7
! 7.7
! 18.3
! 3.3
! 5.0
|}

References

External links

Living people
1993 births
Australian rules footballers from Victoria (Australia)
Essendon Football Club players
Greater Western Sydney Giants players
Geelong Falcons players
People educated at Geelong Grammar School
Crichton Medal winners